John Drake Sloat (July 26, 1781 – November 28, 1867) was a commodore in the United States Navy who, in 1846, claimed California for the United States.

Life
He was born at the family home of Sloat House in Sloatsburg, New York, of Dutch ancestry, and was orphaned at an early age, his father, Captain John Sloat, having been mistakenly shot and killed by one of his own sentries two months before he was born, and his mother dying a few years later. Sloat was brought up by his maternal grandparents.

Appointed midshipman in the Navy in 1800, he was sailing master of the frigate  under Commodore Stephen Decatur during the War of 1812, and was promoted to lieutenant for conspicuous gallantry in the capture of the frigate . Sloat then commanded the schooner  during which he fought the March 1825 naval campaign against the pirate ship of Roberto Cofresí. He was promoted to captain in 1837, and from 1840 to 1844 was in charge of the Portsmouth Navy Yard.

California 
 
In 1844 Sloat was appointed to command the Pacific Squadron, and in 1845, as tensions with Mexico grew, he was instructed to land in Alta California and claim it for the United States if war broke out.  Receiving a report of fighting on the Texas border while off Mazatlán, he raced north (the British were reportedly interested in California too), engaged in a skirmish called the Battle of Monterey, raised the flag over the Customs House at Monterey on July 7, 1846, and issued a proclamation announcing that California was now part of the United States. He was a military Governor of California for only twenty-two days, before handing over the office to Robert F. Stockton.

Later, his poor health forced Sloat to take commands ashore, where he commanded the Norfolk Navy Yard 1847–51, directed the construction of the Stevens Battery in 1855, and helped plan the Mare Island Navy Yard. He retired with the rank of captain in December 1861, and was promoted to rear admiral on the retired list in July 1866. Sloat was a Freemason, and belonged to St. Nicholas lodge No. 321 in New York City.  He died in New Brighton, New York, and was buried in Brooklyn's Green-Wood Cemetery.

Legacy

Two destroyers were named  in his honor as well as the World War II Liberty ship, the SS John Drake Sloat.

The town, Sloat, California, in Plumas County, California was named for him in 1910.

A major street, Sloat Boulevard, and the Commodore Sloat Elementary School, both in San Francisco, California are named for him.

John Sloat Elementary School located in Sacramento, California is named for him.

Streets located in Monterey, California, East Garrison, California, Sacramento, California, and the Carthay Circle neighborhood of Los Angeles bear his name.

There is a monument erected in his honor on the Presidio of Monterey U.S. Army post.

His hometown of Sloatsburg, New York is named after his grandfather, Stephen Sloat.

Dates of Rank
Midshipman - 12 February 1800
Sailing Master - 10 January 1812 
Lieutenant - 24 July 1813
Master Commandant - 21 March 1826
Captain - 9 February 1837
Reserved List - 27 September 1855
Retired List - 21 December 1861
Commodore on Retired List - 16 July 1862
Rear Admiral, Retired List - 25 July 1866

Gallery

Notes

Further reading
Knickerbocker Commodore: The Life and Times of John Drake Sloat, 1781-1867 by Bruce A. Castleman, 2016, State University of New York Press

https://sites.rootsweb.com/~mdannear/firstfam/watkins.htm

References
 Proclamation to the Inhabitants of California (7 July 1846).
 

American people of the Bear Flag Revolt
Commanders of the California Republic
United States military governors of California
People of the Conquest of California
Military personnel from California
United States Navy personnel of the Mexican–American War
United States Navy rear admirals (upper half)
American people of Dutch descent
1781 births
1867 deaths
Burials at Green-Wood Cemetery
People from Sloatsburg, New York
19th-century American politicians